The Diocese of Galloway was one of the thirteen (after 1633 fourteen) dioceses of the pre-1689 Scottish Church. The Diocese was led by the Bishop of Galloway and was centred on Whithorn Cathedral.

In the Middle Ages, there was only one archdeacon, the Archdeacon of Galloway. There are three known deaneries, the deaneries of Desnes (Kirkcudbright), Farines (Wigtown) and Rhinns. The deaneries of Farines and Rhinns had been combined by the 16th century.

List of bishops
 See Bishop of Galloway

List of archdeacons
 See Archdeacon of Galloway

List of cathedral priors
 See Prior of Whithorn

List of known rural deans

Early known rural deans
 Mac Bethad or Máel Bethad, fl. 1165 x 1174
 James, 1185 x 1197

List of known deans of Desnes
 Matthew, 1200 x 1209-1209 x 1222
 Thomas, fl. 1250
 John Wallace, fl. 1331
 Herbert Dunn, fl. 1529.

List of known deans of Farines
 William, fl. 1200 x 1209
 S.[...], fl. 1254-1257

List of known deans of Rhinns
 Gilbert, fl. 1200 x 1209

List of known deans of Farines and Rhinns
 John MacCraken, fl. 1538-1552
 Michael Hawthorn, fl. 1559

List of civil parishes 

 Anwoth
 Balmaclellan
 Balmaghie
 Balnacross
 Borgue
 Buittle
 Clayshant
 Colmonell
 Colvend
 Crossmichael
 Cruggleton
 Dalry
 Dunrod
 Galtway
 Gelston
 Girthon
 Glasserton
 Glenluce
 Inch
 Kells
 Kelton
 Kirkandrews
 Kirkbean
 Kirkbride aka Blaiket
 Kirkchrist
 Kirkcolm
 Kirkcormack
 Kirkcowan
 Kirkcudbright
 Kirkdale
 Kirkgunzeon
 Kirkinner
 Kirkmabreck
 Kirkmadrine
 Kirkmaiden
 Kirkpatrick Durham
 Kirkpatrick Irongray
 Leswalt
 Lochrutton
 Longcastle
 Minigaff
 Mochrum
 New Abbey aka Kinderloch
 Parton
 Penninghame
 Portpatrick
 Rerrick
 Senwick
 Sorbie
 Soulseat
 Southwick
 Stoneykirk
 Terregles
 Tongland
 Toskerton
 Troqueer
 Twynholm
 Urr
 Whithorn (Cathedral)
 Wigtown

Notes

Bibliography
 Watt, D.E.R., Fasti Ecclesiae Scoticanae Medii Aevi ad annum 1638, 2nd Draft, (St Andrews, 1969), pp. 138–9

History of Galloway
Galloway
Christianity in Dumfries and Galloway
1128 establishments in Scotland
1689 disestablishments in Scotland